Paschalidis is a Greek surname. Notable people with the surname include:

Ioannis Paschalidis (born 1968), American engineer
Iordanis Paschalidis (born 1967), Greek yacht racer

Greek-language surnames